Rita Kinka (born 1962, in Subotica), is a Serbian pianist of Hungarian descent.

She graduated at the University of Novi Sad's Academy of Arts (where she is currently a professor) under Arbo Valdma, and finished her studies at the Juilliard School under György Sándor after she was granted the Gina Bachauer scholarship.

Kinka started a concert and recording career after winning the 1988 International Festival of Young Performers in Bordeaux; she had previously been prized at Zwickau's Robert Schumann, Brussels' Queen Elisabeth (Most promising artist prize), Munich's ARD and Sydney's competitions. Three years later she was awarded the Women of Europe Award for the best European interpreter from the European Commission.

References
 Centre culturel français de Belgrade

External links
Official website

Serbian classical pianists
Hungarian classical pianists
Hungarian women pianists
University of Novi Sad alumni
1962 births
Living people
Musicians from Subotica
Sydney International Piano Competition prize-winners
21st-century classical pianists
Academic staff of the University of Novi Sad
21st-century women pianists